In computing, a shebang is the character sequence consisting of the characters number sign and exclamation mark at the beginning of a script. It is also called sharp-exclamation, sha-bang, hashbang, pound-bang, or hash-pling.

When a text file with a shebang is used as if it is an executable in a Unix-like operating system, the program loader mechanism parses the rest of the file's initial line as an interpreter directive. The loader executes the specified interpreter program, passing to it as an argument the path that was initially used when attempting to run the script, so that the program may use the file as input data. For example, if a script is named with the path path/to/script, and it starts with the following line, #!/bin/sh, then the program loader is instructed to run the program /bin/sh, passing path/to/script as the first argument.
In Linux, this behavior is the result of both kernel and user-space code.

The shebang line is usually ignored by the interpreter, because the "#" character is a comment marker in many scripting languages; some language interpreters that do not use the hash mark to begin comments still may ignore the shebang line in recognition of its purpose.

Syntax
The form of a shebang interpreter directive is as follows:
 #!interpreter [optional-arg]
in which interpreter is generally an absolute path to an executable program. The optional argument is a string representing a single argument. White space after  is optional.

In Linux, the file specified by interpreter can be executed if it has one of the following:

 the execute right and contains code which the kernel can execute directly,
 a wrapper defined for it via sysctl (such as for executing Microsoft .exe binaries using wine),
 a shebang.

On Linux and Minix, an interpreter can also be a script. A chain of shebangs and wrappers yields a directly executable file that gets the encountered scripts as parameters in reverse order.

In Solaris- and Darwin-derived operating systems (such as macOS), the file specified by interpreter must be an executable binary and cannot itself be a script.

Examples
Some typical shebang lines:
 #!/bin/sh – Execute the file using the Bourne shell, or a compatible shell, assumed to be in the /bin directory
 #!/bin/bash – Execute the file using the Bash shell
 #!/usr/bin/pwsh – Execute the file using PowerShell
 #!/usr/bin/env python3 – Execute with a Python interpreter, using the env program search path to find it
 #!/bin/false – Do nothing, but return a non-zero exit status, indicating failure.

Shebang lines may include specific options that are passed to the interpreter. However, implementations vary in the parsing behavior of options; for portability, only one option should be specified without any embedded whitespace. Further portability guidelines are found below.

Purpose
Interpreter directives allow scripts and data files to be used as commands, hiding the details of their implementation from users and other programs, by removing the need to prefix scripts with their interpreter on the command line.

A Bourne shell script that is identified by the path some/path/to/foo, has the initial line,
 #!/bin/sh -x
and is executed with parameters bar and baz as
 some/path/to/foo bar baz
provides a similar result as having actually executed the following command line instead:
 /bin/sh -x some/path/to/foo bar baz
If /bin/sh specifies the Bourne shell, then the end result is that all of the shell commands in the file some/path/to/foo are executed with the positional variables $1 and $2 having the values bar and baz, respectively. Also, because the initial number sign is the character used to introduce comments in the Bourne shell language (and in the languages understood by many other interpreters), the whole shebang line is ignored by the interpreter.

However, it is up to the interpreter to ignore the shebang line; thus, a script consisting of the following two lines simply echos both lines to standard output when run:
 #!/bin/cat
 Hello world!

Strengths
When compared to the use of global association lists between file extensions and the interpreting applications, the interpreter directive method allows users to use interpreters not known at a global system level, and without administrator rights. It also allows specific selection of interpreter, without overloading the filename extension namespace (where one file extension refers to more than one file type), and allows the implementation language of a script to be changed without changing its invocation syntax by other programs. Invokers of the script need not know what the implementation language is as the script itself is responsible for specifying the interpreter to use.

Portability

Program location 
Shebangs must specify absolute paths (or paths relative to current working directory) to system executables; this can cause problems on systems that have a non-standard file system layout. Even when systems have fairly standard paths, it is quite possible for variants of the same operating system to have different locations for the desired interpreter. Python, for example, might be in /usr/bin/python3, /usr/local/bin/python3, or even something like /home/username/bin/python3 if installed by an ordinary user.

A similar problem exists for the POSIX shell, since POSIX only required its name to be sh, but did not mandate a path. In many Linux systems, /bin/sh is a hard or symbolic link to /bin/bash, the Bourne Again shell (BASH). Using bash-specific syntax while maintaining a shebang pointing to sh is also not portable.

Because of this it is sometimes required to edit the shebang line after copying a script from one computer to another because the path that was coded into the script may not apply on a new machine, depending on the consistency in past convention of placement of the interpreter. For this reason and because POSIX does not standardize path names, POSIX does not standardize the feature. The GNU Autoconf tool can test for system support with the macro AC_SYS_INTERPRETER.

 #!/usr/bin/env sh

This mostly works because the path  is commonly used for the  utility,
and it invokes the first  found in the user's $PATH, typically .

This still has some portability issues with OpenServer 5.0.6 and Unicos 9.0.2 which have only  and no .

Character interpretation 
Another portability problem is the interpretation of the command arguments.
Some systems, including Linux, do not split up the arguments; for example, when running the script with the first line like,
 #!/usr/bin/env python3 -c
Cygwin also behaves this way.

Complex interpreter invocations are possible through the use of an additional wrapper. FreeBSD 6.0 (2005) introduced a  option to its  as it changed the shebang-reading behavior to non-splitting. This option tells  to split the string itself. The GNU  utility since coreutils 8.30 (2018) also includes this feature. Although using this option mitigates the portability issue on the kernel end with splitting, it adds the requirement that  supports this particular extension.

Another problem is scripts containing a carriage return character immediately after the shebang line, perhaps as a result of being edited on a system that uses DOS line breaks, such as Microsoft Windows. Some systems interpret the carriage return character as part of the interpreter command, resulting in an error message.

Magic number
This magic number is detected by the "exec" family of functions, which determine whether a file is a script or an executable binary. The presence of the shebang will result in the execution of the specified executable, usually an interpreter for the script's language. It has been claimed that some old versions of Unix expect the normal shebang to be followed by a space and a slash, but this appears to be untrue; rather, blanks after the shebang have traditionally been allowed, and sometimes documented with a space (see the 1980 email in history section below).

The shebang characters are represented by the same two bytes in extended ASCII encodings, including UTF-8, which is commonly used for scripts and other text files on current Unix-like systems. Some authorities recommend against using the byte order mark in POSIX (Unix-like) scripts, for this reason and for wider interoperability and philosophical concerns. Additionally, a byte order mark is not necessary in UTF-8, as that encoding does not have endianness issues; it serves only to identify the encoding as UTF-8.

Etymology
An executable file starting with an interpreter directive is simply called a script, often prefaced with the name or general classification of the intended interpreter. The name shebang for the distinctive two characters may have come from an inexact contraction of SHArp bang or haSH bang, referring to the two typical Unix names for them. Another theory on the sh in shebang is that it is from the default shell sh, usually invoked with shebang. This usage was current by December 1989, and probably earlier.

History
The shebang was introduced by Dennis Ritchie between Edition 7 and 8 at Bell Laboratories. It was also added to the BSD releases from Berkeley's Computer Science Research (present at 2.8BSD and activated by default by 4.2BSD). As AT&T Bell Laboratories Edition 8 Unix, and later editions, were not released to the public, the first widely known appearance of this feature was on BSD.

The lack of an interpreter directive, but support for shell scripts, is apparent in the documentation from Version 7 Unix in 1979, which describes instead a facility of the Bourne shell where files with execute permission would be handled specially by the shell, which would (sometimes depending on initial characters in the script, such as ":" or "#") spawn a subshell which would interpret and run the commands contained in the file. In this model, scripts would only behave as other commands if called from within a Bourne shell. An attempt to directly execute such a file via the operating system's own exec() system trap would fail, preventing scripts from behaving uniformly as normal system commands.

In later versions of Unix-like systems, this inconsistency was removed. Dennis Ritchie introduced kernel support for interpreter directives in January 1980, for Version 8 Unix, with the following description:

 From uucp Thu Jan 10 01:37:58 1980
 >From dmr Thu Jan 10 04:25:49 1980 remote from research
 
 The system has been changed so that if a file being executed
 begins with the magic characters #! , the rest of the line is understood
 to be the name of an interpreter for the executed file.
 Previously (and in fact still) the shell did much of this job;
 it automatically executed itself on a text file with executable mode
 when the text file's name was typed as a command.
 Putting the facility into the system gives the following
 benefits.
 
 1) It makes shell scripts more like real executable files,
 because they can be the subject of 'exec.'
 
 2) If you do a 'ps' while such a command is running, its real
 name appears instead of 'sh'.
 Likewise, accounting is done on the basis of the real name.
 
 3) Shell scripts can be set-user-ID.
 
 4) It is simpler to have alternate shells available;
 e.g. if you like the Berkeley csh there is no question about
 which shell is to interpret a file.
 
 5) It will allow other interpreters to fit in more smoothly.
 
 To take advantage of this wonderful opportunity,
 put
 
   #! /bin/sh
  
 at the left margin of the first line of your shell scripts.
 Blanks after ! are OK.  Use a complete pathname (no search is done).
 At the moment the whole line is restricted to 16 characters but
 this limit will be raised.

The feature's creator didn't give it a name, however:
From: "Ritchie, Dennis M (Dennis)** CTR **" <dmr@[redacted]>
To: <[redacted]@talisman.org>
Date: Thu, 19 Nov 2009 18:37:37 -0600
Subject: RE: What do -you- call your #!<something> line?

 I can't recall that we ever gave it a proper name.
It was pretty late that it went in--I think that I
got the idea from someone at one of the UCB conferences
on Berkeley Unix; I may have been one of the first to
actually install it, but it was an idea that I got
from elsewhere.

As for the name: probably something descriptive like
"hash-bang" though this has a specifically British flavor, but
in any event I don't recall particularly using a pet name
for the construction.

Kernel support for interpreter directives spread to other versions of Unix, and one modern implementation can be seen in the Linux kernel source in fs/binfmt_script.c.

This mechanism allows scripts to be used in virtually any context normal compiled programs can be, including as full system programs, and even as interpreters of other scripts. As a caveat, though, some early versions of kernel support limited the length of the interpreter directive to roughly 32 characters (just 16 in its first implementation), would fail to split the interpreter name from any parameters in the directive, or had other quirks.  Additionally, some modern systems allow the entire mechanism to be constrained or disabled for security purposes (for example, set-user-id support has been disabled for scripts on many systems).

Note that, even in systems with full kernel support for the #! magic number, some scripts lacking interpreter directives (although usually still requiring execute permission) are still runnable by virtue of the legacy script handling of the Bourne shell, still present in many of its modern descendants. Scripts are then interpreted by the user's default shell.

See also
 binfmt_misc
 CrunchBang Linux
 File association
 URI fragment

Notes

References

External links
 Details about the shebang mechanism on various Unix flavours
 #! - the Unix truth as far as I know it (a more generic approach)
 FOLDOC shebang article

Unix